{{Taxobox
| name = Maxates dissimulata
| image = 
| image_caption = 
| regnum = Animalia
| phylum = Arthropoda
| classis = Insecta
| ordo = Lepidoptera
| familia = Geometridae 
| genus = Maxates
| species = M. dissimulata
| binomial = Maxates dissimulata
| binomial_authority = (Walker, 1861)
| synonyms = *Gelasma dissimulata Walker, 1861
Thalssodes dissimulata Walker, 1861 
Thalerura marginata Warren, 1894
}}Maxates dissimulata'' is a moth of the family Geometridae. It is found in Bhutan.

References

Moths of Asia
Moths described in 1861